Kevin McGrath (born 1963), is a British financier

Kevin McGrath may also refer to: 

Kevin McGrath (wrestler) (born 1946), Australian Olympic wrestler
Kevin McGrath, American CEO of eDiets and Digital Angel
Kevin McGrath (hurler), see nephew Dónal O'Grady
Kevin McGrath of Philippine Human Development Network